The Colorado Mines Orediggers football team represents the Colorado School of Mines in the sport of American football. Brandon Moore has been the head coach since 2022, succeeding Gregg Brandon after the latter announced his retirement in January 2022. The football team has played in the Rocky Mountain Athletic Conference since 1909. They have won 23 conference titles, with 10 of them occurring prior to joining the RMAC (1888, 1890, 1891, 1892, 1893, 1897, 1898, 1904, 1906, 1907). They have won 15 conference titles in the RMAC (1912, 1914, 1918, 1939, 1942, 1951, 1958, 2004, 2010, 2014, 2016, 2018, 2019, 2021, and 2022). They have made the NCAA Tournament five times in this century. As of the end of the 2022 season, the Orediggers have an all-time record of 507–557–30.

Playoff appearances

NCAA Division II
Colorado Mines has made eight appearances in the NCAA Division II football playoffs, with a combined record of 9–8.

All-time coaching records

Source: Colorado School of Mines Football Media Guide

References

External links
 

 
American football teams established in 1888
1888 establishments in Colorado